"Makes No Difference" is the debut single by Canadian rock band Sum 41. It was released in June 2000 as the lead single from the band's extended play Half Hour of Power. The song is featured on the soundtracks for Bring It On, Out Cold and Van Wilder. A new version of the song was featured on Sum 41's greatest hits compilation, All the Good Shit.

Critical reception
Larry Flick, of Billboard magazine, reviewed the song favorably, saying that it "neatly walks a line between polished modern rock and a clever turn at accessible adult top 40, charged up with grimacing guitars and a pace frantic enough to shake the perm loose from the intended audience's girlfriends."

Music videos
There are two different music videos of this song, both of which were filmed in Toronto.

The first music video contains miscellaneous clips of the band performing, goofing around in shops and spraying people with water guns. This footage was used by the band in order to attract record labels.

The second video, which features Deryck Whibley with black hair, is a very large teenage party that Sum 41 is playing at. A lot of destruction is done to the house as the night goes on, including a car being driven into the house. At one point, rapper DMX makes a cameo appearance on a quad bike. DMX agreed to be in the video as he had been in Toronto at the time filming Exit Wounds.

Appearances in other media
A cover version of the song by Vinn Lombardo is featured in the 2006 Nintendo DS video game Elite Beat Agents.
The song plays during the credits of the Funimation dub of Dragon Ball Z: Bardock - The Father of Goku.
The song is featured in EA Sports' NHL 2002 and Dave Mirra Freestyle BMX 2.
The song is featured on MuchMusic's Big Shiny Tunes 5 compilation album.
The song also appears in the films Summer Catch, Out Cold and Van Wilder.
The song is also featured in the 2000 film Bring It On.
The song plays during the closing credits of Season 5 Episode 2 ("Sappy Anniversary") of the MTV animated series Daria.

Credits and personnel
Credits and personnel are adapted from the Half Hour of Power album liner notes.
 Deryck "Bizzy D" Whibley – writer, producer, guitar, vocals
 Dave "Hot Chocolate" Baksh – writer, guitar, vocals
 Steve "Stevo 32" Jocz – writer, drums
 Jason "Cone" McCaslin – writer, bass
 Greg Nori – producer
 Blair Calibaba – engineering
 Jerry Finn – mixing
 Howie Weinberg – mastering
 Roger Lian – mastering

Charts

Release history

References

External links
"Makes No Difference" music video (original version) at YouTube

2000 debut singles
2000 songs
Sum 41 songs
Island Records singles
Songs written by Deryck Whibley
Songs written by Greig Nori